The Sacred Fountain (French: La Fontaine sacrée ou la Vengeance de Boudha) is a 1901 French short silent comedy film, directed by Georges Méliès. It is listed as number 360 in Star Film Company's catalogues. The film is believed to be lost.

References

French silent short films
French black-and-white films
Films directed by Georges Méliès
Lost French films
French comedy short films
1901 comedy films
1901 films
1900s lost films
Lost comedy films
Silent comedy films
1900s French films